Elections to Pembrokeshire County Council were held on 6 May 1999.  It was preceded by the 1995 election and followed by the 2004 election.  On the same day there were the first elections to the Welsh Assembly and elections to the other 21 local authorities in Wales and community councils in Wales.

All council seats were up for election.

Overview
Boundary changes were introduced at this election. In the main, however, these resulted in the splitting of multi-member wards in urban areas into single-member wards. The Independents retained control of the authority although there was an increased number of party candidates. Most notably, the Conservative Party fielded a large slate of candidates for the first time. Three of these candidates were successful.

|}

Unopposed Returns
There were comparatively few unopposed returns, partly as a result of the increasingly politicised nature of the election.

Gains and Losses
As number of seats changed hands, including several cases where one Independent defeated another.

Results

Amroth
The Liberal Democrat candidate had been returned unopposed in 1995.

Burton

Camrose
Desmond Codd had been returned unopposed in 1995.

Carew

Cilgerran

Clydau

Crymych

Dinas Cross

East Williamston

Fishguard North East

Fishguard North West

Goodwick
The retiring member, a long-serving county and district councillor, elected as an Independent in 1995, had subsequently joined the Labour Party.

Haverfordwest Castle

Haverfordwest Garth

Haverfordwest Portfield

Haverfordwest Prendergast

Haverfordwest Priory

Hundleton

Johnston

Kilgetty / Begelly

Lampeter Velfrey

Lamphey
The Independent candidate had been a Labour councillor on the previous South Pembrokeshire District Council but was defeated at the inaugural election in 1995.

Letterston

Llangwm

Llanrhian

Maenclochog

Manorbier

Martletwy

Merlin’s Bridge

Milford Central

Milford East

Milford Hakin

Milford Hubberston

Milford North

Milford West

Narberth

-->

Narberth Rural

Newport

Neyland East

Neyland West

-->

Pembroke Monkton

Pembroke St Mary North

Pembroke St Mary South

Pembroke St Michael

Pembroke Dock Central

Pembroke Dock Llanion

Pembroke Dock Market

Pembroke Dock Pennar

Penally

Rudbaxton

St David's

St Dogmaels

St Ishmael's

Saundersfoot

Scleddau

Solva

Tenby North (two seats)

Tenby South

The Havens
The boundaries were identical to those of the same ward on the previous Preseli / South Pembrokeshire District Council.

Wiston
The boundaries were identical to those of the same ward on the previous Preseli / South Pembrokeshire District Council.

References

1999
1999 Welsh local elections
20th century in Pembrokeshire